Stephani Victor (born August 29, 1969) is an LW 12–2 alpine skier Paralympic multi medalist.

Early life and education
Stephani Victor was born on August 29, 1969, in Ames, Iowa. She finished high school in Sewickley, Pennsylvania and graduated from a film studies program at the University of Southern California in 1992.

Personal life
Stephani Victor lost her legs after she was pinned between two cars. "The seemingly insurmountable challenge of no longer having legs was so difficult and extreme beyond my imagination that it forced me to fight to maintain my independence. The fight began with a single pull-up in my hospital bed and evolved into a relentless search for the sport I could dedicate myself to." That search led her to Marcel Kuonen, then-head coach at the National Ability Center in Park City, Utah.  Kuonen, himself a former Swiss Ski Team racer, saw Victor's potential and sparked in her the vision to recreate herself as the best alpine ski racer in the world, despite having no legs. Their   teamwork and partnership developed into a lifelong committed union, and in 2004, on a glacier in Zermatt, Switzerland, Kuonen proposed to Victor.  They married in Deer Valley, Utah, in 2005.

Career
Competing at the 2010 Winter Paralympics, she won a gold medal in the women's super combined sitting event. She also won silver medals in the women's sitting slalom and the women's sitting giant slalom.

Awards and honours
Victor was named the Paralympic Sportswoman of the year by the United States Olympic Committee in 2009.

References 
 https://www.paralympic.org/stephani-victor
https://www.stephanivictor.com/athlete/

External links 
 
 

American female alpine skiers
Alpine skiers at the 2010 Winter Paralympics
Paralympic alpine skiers of the United States
Medalists at the 2010 Winter Paralympics
Paralympic gold medalists for the United States
Paralympic silver medalists for the United States
Living people
1969 births
Medalists at the 2002 Winter Paralympics
Paralympic medalists in alpine skiing
21st-century American women